Jim Herrick (born 1944) is a British humanist and secularist. He studied history and English literature at Trinity College, Cambridge University, and then worked as a school teacher for seven years.  He has written or edited several books on humanism or the history of freethought.

Biography 

Herrick is a trustee of the Rationalist Association and was editor of its journal New Humanist for 18 years from 1984. He subsequently became literary editor of New Humanist until his retirement in 2005. He was the recipient of the second International Rationalist Award in the year 2002.

He was editor of International Humanist News, published by the International Humanist and Ethical Union (IHEU). In 1996 he received the Distinguished Humanist Service Award from the IHEU. He was a signatory to Humanist Manifesto III.

From January 1977 until 1981, Herrick edited The Freethinker. He later wrote that publication's centenary history.  He was a founder member of the Gay and Lesbian Humanist Association.

Herrick stepped down as a vice-president of the National Secular Society at the 2007 AGM  but remained on the Council of Management until stepping down at the 2009 AGM.

Publications
 Aspiring to the Truth: Two Hundred Years of the South Place Ethical Society. (2016). With an introduction by Nicolas Walter. Published by CreateSpace Independent Publishing Platform. .
Humanism: An Introduction. (2003). . (Also published by Prometheus Books, 2005. )
Humanist Anthology: From Confucius to David Attenborough. (1995). London, Rationalist Press Association. Edited by Margaret Knight; 2nd edition, revised by Jim Herrick. 
Against the Faith: Some Deists, Skeptics and Atheists. (1985). London: Glover & Blair.  (Also published by Prometheus Books, 1994. ).
Vision and Realism: A Hundred Years of The Freethinker. (1982). London: GW Foote & Co. 
Selected articles for New Humanist on the newhumanist.org.uk website.

References

1944 births
20th-century atheists
21st-century atheists
Alumni of Trinity College, Cambridge
British atheism activists
British humanists
English atheists
Freethought writers
Living people
Writers about religion and science